UFC Fight Night: Swick vs. Burkman (also known as UFC Fight Night 12) was a mixed martial arts (MMA) event held by the Ultimate Fighting Championship (UFC) on January 23, 2008, at the Palms Casino Resort in Las Vegas, Nevada.

Background
The main event featured former The Ultimate Fighter contestants Mike Swick and Josh Burkman in a welterweight matchup. This event was Swick's debut at welterweight, as he had been competing at middleweight prior to the show.

Results

Bonus awards
Fighters were awarded $40,000 bonuses.

Fight of the Night: Gray Maynard vs. Dennis Siver
Knockout of the Night: Patrick Côté
Submission of the Night: Nate Diaz

See also
 Ultimate Fighting Championship
 List of UFC champions
 List of UFC events
 2008 in UFC

References

UFC Fight Night
2008 in mixed martial arts
Mixed martial arts in Las Vegas
2008 in sports in Nevada
Palms Casino Resort